General John Hope, 4th Earl of Hopetoun,  (17 August 1765 – 27 August 1823), known as The Honourable John Hope from 1781 to 1814 and as Lord Niddry from 1814 to 1816, was a Scottish politician and British Army officer.

Military career
Hopetoun was the only son of John Hope, 2nd Earl of Hopetoun, by his second wife Jane or Jean Oliphant. His mother died when he was only one year old. He was commissioned into the 10th Light Dragoons in 1784. He sat as Member of Parliament for Linlithgowshire from 1790 to 1800.

He took part in the capture of the French West Indies and Spanish West Indies in 1796 and 1797. In 1799 he was sent to Den Helder as Deputy Adjutant-General and was present at the Battle of Bergen and the Battle of Castricum. In 1801 he was sent to Cairo and then to Alexandria to take the surrender of the French garrisons there. He became Lieutenant-Governor of Portsmouth and General Officer Commanding South-West District in June 1805.

He commanded a division during the advance into Spain and commanded the British left at the Battle of Corunna in 1809, succeeding to overall command when Sir John Moore was killed. Later that year he commanded the reserve army during the Walcheren Campaign. He was appointed Commander-in-Chief, Ireland and was admitted to the Irish Privy Council in 1812. He then commanded the 1st Division under The Duke of Wellington at the Battle of Nivelle and at the Battle of the Nive in 1813. He was captured fighting the French sortie at the Battle of Bayonne in 1814.

He served as Lord-Lieutenant of Linlithgowshire from 1816 to 1823. On 17 May 1814, two years before he succeeded in the earldom, he was raised to the peerage in his own right as Baron Niddry, of Niddry Castle in the County of Linlithgow. In 1816 he succeeded his elder half-brother as fourth Earl of Hopetoun.

He died in Paris, France on 27 August 1823.

Family
In 1798 Lord Hopetoun married firstly Elizabeth Hope Vere (or Weir) of Craigiehall, daughter of Charles Hope-Weir. After her death he married secondly Louisa Dorothea Wedderburn, daughter of John Wedderburn of Ballendean, and granddaughter of Sir John Wedderburn, 5th Baronet of Blackness.

On his death he was succeeded in his titles by his eldest son from his second marriage, John. Lady Hopetoun died in 1836.

Monuments

Following Lord Hopetoun's death, the Hopetoun Monument was erected on Byres Hill, East Lothian, in 1824.  This was followed in 1826 by a similar monument on Mount Hill in Fife. In 1824 the city of Edinburgh commissioned a bronze statue of Lord Hopetoun, by Thomas Campbell, and originally designed as a centrepiece for Charlotte Square in 1829, but which was eventually placed in St Andrew Square in 1834, in front of Dundas House where he had acted as vice governor of the bank. The text on the latter is by Sir Walter Scott. In the wake of the George Floyd protests, a plaque was installed by its owners in June 2020 on the statue which reflected Lord Hopetoun's role in suppressing Fédon's rebellion, an uprising against British rule on the island of Grenada.

Notes

References 
Kidd, Charles, Williamson, David (editors). Debrett's Peerage and Baronetage (1990 edition). New York: St Martin's Press, 1990, 

 Smith, Digby. The Napoleonic Wars Data Book. London: Greenhill, 1998.

External links

|-

|-

|-

|-

1765 births
1823 deaths
British Army generals
British Army personnel of the French Revolutionary Wars
British Army commanders of the Napoleonic Wars
Earls of Hopetoun
Gordon Highlanders officers
King's Royal Rifle Corps officers
Commanders-in-Chief, Ireland
Lord-Lieutenants of West Lothian
42nd Regiment of Foot officers
John
Members of the Parliament of Great Britain for Scottish constituencies
British MPs 1790–1796
British MPs 1796–1800
Members of the Privy Council of Ireland
Members of the Royal Company of Archers
Peers of the United Kingdom created by George III